Parmy Olson is a tech journalist for The Wall Street Journal. While at Forbes, she was known for her work on the hacktivist movement Anonymous. She describes herself as covering "agitators and innovators in mobile".

Early in her career with Forbes, she wrote a series of articles about the subprime mortgage crisis. She served as Forbes London bureau chief from 2008–12 before moving to the magazine's San Francisco office.

We Are Anonymous
In 2012, Little, Brown and Company published her book We Are Anonymous: Inside the Hacker World of LulzSec, Anonymous, and the Global Cyber Insurgency. Prior to writing it, Olson had spent a year researching Anonymous. The book details the early rise of Anonymous on the 4chan imageboard and chronicles the cyberattacks of Project Chanology (an anti-Church of Scientology protest) and Operation Payback (retaliation for actions against The Pirate Bay and WikiLeaks, respectively). In the book's later chapters, Olson follows the exploits and eventual arrests of Anonymous spinoff group LulzSec, formed by hacktivists Sabu, Topiary, and others.

Janet Maslin of The New York Times called We Are Anonymous a "lively, startling book". Rowan Kaiser of The A.V. Club said the book was "an eminently human tale" that moves "from an interesting retelling of recent events into a bigger metaphorical story about order and chaos in activist communities"; Kaiser gave it a grade of "A". Olson appeared on The Daily Show with Jon Stewart to discuss the book on June 18, 2012. The Daily called it "a brilliant book": "a masterpiece of shoe-leather journalism, a fast-paced, richly detailed account of the group’s beginnings, various schisms and most spectacular attacks".

Kirkus Reviews praised Olson's depictions of some events, but stated that the descriptions of Anonymous infighting were "lengthy" and "tiresome". The review concluded that We Are Anonymous was "certain to thrill 4chan readers, hackers and others on the Internet’s fringe, but may struggle to hold the interest of casual readers." Quinn Norton of Wired wrote a negative review of the book, criticizing Olson's grasp of technical detail, her focus on criminal elements of Anonymous, and her perceived failure to acknowledge the difficulties of writing about a group known for secrecy, dishonesty, and self-aggrandizement. She concludes her review, "the only voices in Olson's book are those of the small groups of hackers who stole the limelight from a legion, defied their values, and crashed violently into the law. It was a mediagenic story to be sure, but in the end, it turns out to be not the real story of Anonymous, and not a story with any real meaning."

References

External links 
 

Anonymous (hacker group)
Business and financial journalists
Living people
Year of birth missing (living people)